Pavel Kimovich Baev (born 22 May 1957) is a Russian-Norwegian political scientist and security scholar. He is currently a research professor at the Peace Research Institute Oslo (PRIO) and a senior nonresident fellow at the Brookings Institution (Washington, DC).

Baev graduated from Moscow State University (M.A. in economic and political geography, 1979) and worked in a research institute in the USSR Ministry of Defence. He received his PhD in international relations from the Institute for US and Canadian Studies in Moscow in 1988, then worked in the newly created Institute of Europe in Moscow until 1992, when he moved to Oslo, Norway and joined PRIO. In 1994–1996, he held a Democratic Institutions Fellowship from NATO. From 1995–2001, Baev was co-editor of the academic journal Security Dialogue, and from 1999-2005 he was a member of the PRIO board.

Baev's current research includes the transformation of the Russian military, Russia – European Union relations, Russia's energy policy, Russia's policy in the Arctic, terrorism and conflicts in the Caucasus.

He is a member of the PONARS Eurasia program, currently located at the Institute for European, Russian, and Eurasian Studies at the Elliot School of International Affairs, George Washington University.

Baev is the author of several books and academic articles and he is a regular columnist in the Eurasia Daily Monitor published by the Jamestown Foundation.

Recent publications 
 Baev, Pavel K., 2011. Russia: Moscow Does Not Believe in Change, in Kenneth M. Pollack (ed.), The Arab Awakening. Washington, DC: The Brookings Institution.
 Baev, Pavel K., 2011. The Continuing Revolution in Russian Military Affairs, in Maria Lipman and Nikolai Petrov (eds), Russia-2020: Scenarios for the Future. Washington, DC: Carnegie Endowment for International Peace.
 Anker, Morten; Pavel K. Baev, Bjørn Brunstad, Indra Øverland & Stina Torjesen, 2010. The Caspian Sea Region towards 2025. Delft: Eburon.
 Baev, Pavel K., 2010. Russian Military Perestroika. US – Europe Analysis Series Number 45. Washington, DC: The Brookings Institution.
 Baev, Pavel K., 2010. The South Stream versus Nabucco Pipeline Race, International Affairs 68(5): 1075–1090.
 Trenin, Dmitri & Pavel K. Baev, 2010. The Arctic: A View from Moscow. Carnegie Report. Washington, DC: Carnegie Endowment.
 Baev, Pavel K., 2008. Russian Energy Policy and Military Power: Putin’s Quest for Greatness. London: Routledge.

External links 
 
 Baev's blog

1957 births
Living people
Norwegian political scientists
Russian political scientists
Peace and conflict scholars
Norwegian columnists
Moscow State University alumni
Writers from Vladivostok